Future Now is the fifth album by Portland, Oregon-based R&B group Pleasure, released in 1979. It includes the top-ten R&B hit "Glide".

Track listing
"Departure" – 0:44
"Future Now" – 5:34
"Universal" – 3:17
"Space Is the Place" – 4:10
"Strong Love" – 4:42
"The Real Thing" – 5:40
"Nothin' to It" – 4:07
"Thoughts of Old Flames" – 4:11
"Glide" – 6:24
"Dedication to the Past" – 0:38

Personnel
Nathaniel Phillips – Electric bass, "Sok" bass, backing vocals
Bruce Carter – Drums
Larry Williams – Alto saxophone, soprano saxophone 
Sherman Davis – Lead and backing vocals
Marlon "The Magician" McClain – Electric guitar, acoustic guitar, backing vocals  
Dennis Springer – Soprano saxophone 
Jerry Hey – Trumpet
 Clydene Jackson, Julia Tillman Waters, Maxine Willard Waters, Pat Henderson – Backing vocals

Charts

References

External links
  Pleasure-Future Now at Discogs
 Pleasure chart history at AllMusic

1979 albums
Pleasure (American band) albums
Fantasy Records albums